The 1982 Scottish League Cup final was played on 4 December 1982, at Hampden Park in Glasgow and was the final of the 37th Scottish League Cup competition. The final was contested by the Old Firm rivals, Celtic and Rangers. Celtic won the match 2–1 thanks to goals by Charlie Nicholas and Murdo MacLeod. Rangers goal was scored by Jim Bett.

Match details

External links
 Soccerbase

1982
League Cup Final
Scottish League Cup Final 1982
Scottish League Cup Final 1982
20th century in Glasgow
Old Firm matches